Anoiapithecus is an extinct ape genus thought to be closely related to Dryopithecus.  Both genera lived during the Miocene, approximately 12 million years ago. Fossil specimens named by Salvador Moyà-Solà are known from the deposits from Spain.

The discoverers described Anoiapithecus brevirostris as a hominoid (superfamily Hominoidea) in the dryopithecine tribe. They believe that it has more modern traits than the Kenyapithecines from which Kenya's Kenyapithecus wickeri brings fragmentary information. The African specimens are considered a sister taxon to the hominids, and 2 million years younger European specimens must be from the time after these two groups split. This means that hominids may have evolved in Europe.

The name comes from the Anoia River region in Catalonia, where the fossil was found. It has been given the nickname Lluc (since it is a male individual). The name Lluc is the Catalan form of Luke, which in Latin suggests "light", as this discovery enlighted our early evolution.

The modern anatomical features that characterized the family Hominidae visible in Lluc's fossil among others are: unique facial pattern for hominoids, nasal aperture wide at the base, high cheek bone, and deep palate.

See also

References

Prehistoric apes
Miocene primates of Europe
Fossil taxa described in 2009
Fossils of Spain
Prehistoric primate genera